Kabataang Barangay elections (KB) were held on May 26, 1980, in which about 3 million Filipino youths aged 15 to 18 years old participated. Each Barangay in the Philippines is mandated by law to have its own chapter of the Katipunan ng Kabataan in which the members elect their officers called as the Kabataang Barangay.

Resources
G.R. No. 108399 - Alunan III, et al. vs. Mirasol, et al.
Background of the Kabataang Barangay

See also
Commission on Elections
Politics of the Philippines
Philippine elections

1980
Kabataang Barangay election